HP/De Tijd is a Dutch language monthly opinion magazine published by the Audax Groep. Its editorial offices are in Amsterdam, Netherlands. Alongside De Groene Amsterdammer, Vrij Nederland and Elsevier, it is one of the most influential Dutch opinion magazines.

The circulation of HP/De Tijd was 28,662 copies in the last quarter of 2008. The paid net circulation of the magazine was 19,168 copies in the last quarter of 2011.

History

De Tijd

De Tijd was a Dutch-language Catholic daily newspaper published from 1845 until 1974. At the end of pillarisation (religious segregation) the number of subscribers diminished drastically and the daily became a weekly in 1974. 

The first edition of De Tijd was published 17 June 1845 in 's-Hertogenbosch; at this time the newspaper appeared thrice weekly.  was the founder and editor in chief.  In 1846 De Tijd (which at that time had 250 subscribers) moved to Amsterdam, in order to attract more subscribers. It also started publishing daily.

Haagse Post
Haagse Post was a social liberal news magazine published weekly from 1914 to 1969. Audax Groep bought the magazine in 1994 from publisher HPU, VNU and MeesPierson bank.

HP/De Tijd
In 1990, De Tijd merged with the Haagse Post weekly news magazine to become HP/De Tijd, a weekly news magazine. De Tijd was a Catholic weekly magazine. In the early 2000s HP/De Tijd was known for its right-wing discourse, often featuring right-wing personalities such as Pim Fortuyn.

On 25 April 2012, HP/De Tijd became a monthly published magazine.

Editor-in-chief
 Ad 's-Gravesande (1990–1991)
 Gerard Driehuis (1991–1995)
 Auke Kok (1995–1996)
 Bert Vuijsje (1996–2000)
 Henk Steenhuis (2000–2008)
 Jan Dijkgraaf (2009–2010)
 Eduard van Holst Pellekaan (2010–2011)
 Frank Poorthuis (2011–2012)
 Daan Dijksman and Boudewijn Geels (2013)
 Tom Kellerhuis (2014–present)

Distribution

Ownership
 1990-1994: Hollandse Pers Unie (70%), VNU (30%)
 Since 1995: Audax Groep (100%)

References

External links
HP/De Tijd

1990 establishments in the Netherlands
Dutch-language magazines
Magazines established in 1990
Magazines published in Amsterdam
Monthly magazines published in the Netherlands
News magazines published in Europe
Opinion journalism
Political magazines published in the Netherlands
Weekly magazines published in the Netherlands